Matheus França Silva (born 8 September 2000), commonly known as Matheuzinho, is a Brazilian footballer who plays as a right back for Campeonato Brasileiro Série A club Flamengo.

Career

Londrina

Flamengo
In January 2019, Flamengo agreed to sign Matheuzinho from Londrina for a €180.000 fee; Londrina kept 50% of his rights.

On 2 June 2022, Matheuzinho extended his contract with Flamengo until 31 December 2026.

Career statistics

Club

Notes

Honours
Flamengo
Campeonato Brasileiro Série A: 2020
Supercopa do Brasil: 2021
Campeonato Carioca: 2020, 2021
Copa do Brasil: 2022
 Copa Libertadores: 2022
Individual
Campeonato Carioca Team of the Year: 2021

References

External links
Matheuzinho at ZeroZero

2000 births
Living people
Brazilian footballers
Association football defenders
Londrina Esporte Clube players
CR Flamengo footballers
Campeonato Brasileiro Série A players
Campeonato Brasileiro Série B players
Copa Libertadores-winning players
Sportspeople from Londrina